The 1897 Sheffield Brightside by-election was held on 6 August 1897 due to the death of the incumbent Liberal MP Anthony John Mundella. It was won by the Liberal-Labour candidate Frederick Maddison.

References

By-elections to the Parliament of the United Kingdom in Sheffield constituencies
August 1897 events
1897 elections in the United Kingdom
1897 in England
19th century in Sheffield
19th century in Yorkshire